An adjoint equation is a linear differential equation, usually derived from its primal equation using integration by parts.  Gradient values with respect to a particular quantity of interest can be efficiently calculated by solving the adjoint equation. Methods based on solution of adjoint equations are used in wing shape optimization, fluid flow control and uncertainty quantification. For example  this is an Itō stochastic differential equation. Now by using Euler scheme, we integrate the parts of this equation and get another equation, here  is a random variable, later one is an adjoint equation.

Example: Advection-Diffusion PDE

Consider the following linear, scalar advection-diffusion equation for the primal solution , in the domain  with Dirichlet boundary conditions:

Let the output of interest be the following linear functional:

Derive the weak form by multiplying the primal equation with a weighting function  and performing integration by parts:

where,

Using the weak form above and the definition of the adjoint  given below:

we obtain:

Next, use integration by parts to transfer derivatives of  into derivatives of :

The adjoint PDE and its boundary conditions can be deduced from the last equation above. Similarly, since the primal flux  is generally non-zero at the boundary, we require  to be zero there in order for the first boundary term to vanish. The second boundary term vanishes trivially since the primal boundary condition requires  at the boundary. 

Therefore, the adjoint problem is given by:

Note that the advection term reverses the sign of the convective velocity  in the adjoint equation, whereas the diffusion term remains self-adjoint.

See also
 Adjoint state method
 Costate equations

References

 

Differential calculus